The House of Commons Commission Act 2015 amends the House of Commons (Administration) Act 1978 to add functions and change the membership of the House of Commons Commission.

Provisions

Section 1 -  Members of the Commission etc. 
This section adds five new members to the existing Commission of six MPs: one extra Member of Parliament and four non-Members.

Subsection (4) specifies that the official members are the Clerk of the House of Commons and the Director General of the House of Commons, a new position recommended by the Governance Committee. The subsection allows the Commission to appoint other House officials if either of these posts is vacant.

Section 2 -  Functions of the Commission 
This section gives the Commission specific statuary powers of setting strategic priorities and objectives for services provided by the House Departments.

References 

United Kingdom Acts of Parliament 2015
2015 in British law
Acts of the Parliament of the United Kingdom concerning the House of Commons